Fernando Mariaca (born 30 May 1959) is a Spanish weightlifter. He competed at the 1984 Summer Olympics, the 1988 Summer Olympics and the 1992 Summer Olympics.

References

1959 births
Living people
Spanish male weightlifters
Olympic weightlifters of Spain
Weightlifters at the 1984 Summer Olympics
Weightlifters at the 1988 Summer Olympics
Weightlifters at the 1992 Summer Olympics
Sportspeople from Álava
20th-century Spanish people